Province of Spalato was a province of the Italian Governorate of Dalmatia, created in May 1941 during World War II (by the "Regio Decreto Legge del 18 maggio 1941"). It lasted until September 1943.

History
The puppet Independent State of Croatia ceded by the Treaties of Rome of 18 May 1941, extensive Adriatic coastal areas to the Fascist Kingdom of Italy. The ruling Italian National Fascist Party was a patron of Croatian fascist Ustasha Movement. Italy placed Ustasha leader Ante Pavelić as the head of Croatian puppet State after the dissolution of Yugoslavia in the April War 1941. Among the ceded areas was the city of Split in Dalmatia. 

Italy created some provinces (administrative districts) in that region, that lasted until September 1943. One was the province of Spalato. The administrative capital was the city of Spalato (Italian name for Split).

The province had an area of 1,075 square kilometers and a population of 128,000 inhabitants. Most of the province's inhabitants were Croats, but there were more than 3,000 Dalmatian Italians (in Split alone there were over 1,000 in 1940, even if very few in number compared to the mid-19th century, when they were over a third of the city's inhabitants). The island of Lastovo, ceded after World War I to Italy and renamed Lagosta, was united to the province.

The Italians started immediately a process of forced Italianization (related to the history of Venetian Dalmatia). Because of this, in summer 1941 there was a resistance movement of Croats against the Italian conquest, but without huge consequences until spring/summer 1943. In spring 1942 was created the football team Associazione Calcio Spalato, that was ruled by the Italian FIGC in the Italian championships. Meanwhile, in 1941 and 1942 many Jews and some Serbs took refuge in the city, escaping  from the nearby regions ruled by the Croatian Ustaše.

In September 1943 the German army took control of the region from the Italians, who had surrendered to the Allies, and soon started a terrible guerrilla war between the German occupiers and Josip Broz Tito's partisans. The province was cancelled in the same September and later annexed to Ante Pavelić's puppet Croatia.

Administrative subdivision

The 13 comuni were (first in Italian the official name and then in Croatian the actual)::
Spalato / Split
Blatta / Blato
Castella Inferiore or Castel Vecchio / Kaštel Stari ili Donja Kaštela
Castelli / Kaštel Sućurac
Castel Vitturi / Kaštel Lukšić
Comisa / Komiža
Curzola / Korčula
Lagosta / Lastovo
Lissa / Vis
Meleda / Mljet
Solta / Šolta
Traù / Trogir
Vallegrande / Vela Luka

See also
Governatorate of Dalmatia
Province of Zara
Province of Cattaro

Notes and references

Notes

References

Bibliography
 Rodogno, Davide. Il nuovo ordine mediterraneo, ed. Bollati Boringhieri. Turin, 2003
 Dalmacija in Hrvatska enciklopedija on line

Spalato
1941 establishments in the Italian Empire
1943 disestablishments in the Italian Empire
1941 establishments in Croatia
1943 disestablishments in Croatia
Adriatic question